This is a timeline documenting events of Jazz in the year 1952.

Events
 The pianist John Lewis initiates the Modern Jazz Quartet together with vibraphonist Milt Jackson, bassist Percy Heath, and drummer Kenny Clarke.
 Thelonious Monk starts making records for Prestige.
 The young trumpeter Chet Baker play with Charlie Parker before he joines the quartet of Gerry Mulligan.
 The health of guitarist Django Reinhardt is starting to fail. His fingers are getting stiff.
 Les Paul introduces his new invention, the solid body guitar, when Gibson begins marketing the classic guitar which bears his name.

Album releases

 Gerry Mulligan: Gerry Mulligan Quartet Volume 1 (Pacific Jazz)
 Johnny Smith: Moonlight in Vermont originally Jazz at NBC Series (Royal Roost)
 Stan Kenton: New Concepts of Artistry in Rhythm (Capitol)
 Nat King Cole: Penthouse Serenade (Capitol)
 Duke Ellington: Ellington Uptown (Columbia)

  Charlie Parker and Dizzy Gillespie: Bird and Diz (Clef/Verve)
 Oscar Peterson: An Evening with Oscar Peterson (Clef Records)

 Oscar Peterson: Oscar Peterson Plays Duke Ellington (Clef Records)
 Dave Brubeck: The Dave Brubeck Quartet (Fantasy Records)
 Bud Powell: The Amazing Bud Powell (Blue Note)

Standards

Deaths

 January
 9 – Midge Williams, African-American singer (born 1915).

 February
 23 – Herb Morand, American trumpeter (born 1905).

 March
 27 – Cassino Simpson, American pianist (born 1909).

 April
 26 – Zinky Cohn, American pianist (born 1908).

 June
 14 – John Kirby, American upright bassist who also played trombone and tuba (born 1908).

 November
 20 – Mal Hallett, American jazz violinist and bandleader (born 1893).

 December
 29 – Fletcher Henderson, American pianist, bandleader, arranger and composer (born 1897).
 31 – Mel Stitzel, German-born pianist best known for his work with the New Orleans Rhythm Kings (born 1902).

Births

 January
 2 – Viatcheslav Nazarov, Russian trombonist, pianist, and vocalist (died 1996).
 10 – William Parker, American bassist, poet, and composer.
 11 – Lee Ritenour, American guitarist.
 13 – Pekka Pohjola, Finnish multi-instrumentalist, composer, and producer (died 2008). 
 19 – Eric Leeds, American saxophonist.
 27 – Ray Obiedo, American contemporary jazz guitarist.

 February
 18 – Randy Crawford, American singer.
 20 – Uwe Kropinski, German guitarist.
 22 – ** Ken Pickering, Canadian jazz promotor, Vancouver Jazz Festival co-founder (died 2018).
 March
 11 – Vince Giordano, American saxophonist, Nighthawks Orchestra.
 17 – Manolo Badrena, Puerto Rican percussionist, Weather Report.
 19 – Chris Brubeck, American bassist, bass trombonist, and pianist.
 21 – Carlo Actis Dato, Italian saxophonist and composer.
 22 – Bob Mover, American saxophonist and vocalist.
 26 – Paolo Damiani, Italian cellist and upright bassist.
 29 – Errol Dyers, South African guitarist and composer (died 2017).

 April
 2 – Dave Buxton, English pianist and composer.
 6 – Richard Tabnik, American saxophonist.
 8 – Yildiz Ibrahimova, Bulgarian singer of Turkish ancestry.
 12 – Jeff Linsky, American guitarist.
 16 – Jukka Tolonen, Finnish guitarist.
 25 – Ketil Bjørnstad, Norwegian pianist, American composer and writer.
 28 – Leni Stern, German guitarist, singer, and n'goni (Malian banjo-guitar) player.
 29 – Dave Valentin, American flautist (died 2017).

 May
 2 – Mari Natsuki, Japanese singer.
 8 – John Purcell, American saxophonist.
 24
 Dave DeFries, British trumpeter, flugelhornist, and percussionist.
 Pierre Van Dormael, Belgian musician and composer (died 2008).
 29 – Hilton Ruiz, American pianist (died 2006).

 June
 5 – Monnette Sudler, American guitarist.
 7 – Royce Campbell, American guitarist.
 12
 Bent Patey, Norwegian guitarist, composer, and writer.
 Jed Williams, Welsh jazz journalist and the founder of the Brecon Jazz Festival (died 2003).
 13 – Clarence Banks, American trombonist, Count Basie Orchestra.
 16 – Gino Vannelli, Canadian singer, songwriter, musician and composer.
 19 – Sidsel Endresen, Norwegian vocalist, composer and actor. 
 20 – Gary Lucas, American guitarist, Gods and Monsters.
 23 – Anthony Jackson, American bassist.
 25 – Radka Toneff, Norwegian singer (died 1982).
 28 – Alan Pasqua, American pianist.

 July
 1
 Ichiko Hashimoto, Japanese pianist, composer and singer.
 Leon "Ndugu" Chancler, American drummer (died 2018).
 Timothy J. Tobias, American composer and pianist (died 2006).
 7 – Sue Keller, American pianist and singer
 23 – Janis Siegel, American singer.
 26 – Christian Lauba, Tunisian born French composer and teacher.

 August
 11
 Finn Sletten, Norwegian drummer.
 Harry Tavitian, Romanian pianist and singer.
 14 – George E. Lewis, American composer, electronic performer, installation artist, and trombonist.
 19 – Bruce Katz, American pianist, organist, and bass guitarist.
 20 – John Clayton, American upright bassist.
 25
 Ben Brown, American upright bassist.
 Michael Marcus, American clarinetist and multi-woodwind player.
 26
 Michael Wolff, Austrian pianist, composer, and producer.
 Peter Wolf, Austrian composer, producer, songwriter, and arranger.

 September
 1 – Ed Neumeister, American trombonist.
 6 – Phil Markowitz, American pianist.
 9 – Per Jørgensen, Norwegian trumpeter, vocalist, and multi-instrumentalist, JøKleBa.
 19
 Henry Kaiser, American guitarist and composer.
 Uffe Markussen, Danish reedist.
 22 – Oliver Mtukudzi, Zimbabwean guitarist (died 2019).
 26 – Mark Dresser, American upright bassist and composer.
 29 – Roy Campbell, Jr., American trumpeter (died 2014).

 October
 11 – Brian Jackson, American keyboardist, flautist, singer, composer, and producer.
 16 – Ray Anderson, American trombonist and trumpeter.
 21 – Ali Ryerson, American flautist.
 27 – Ken Filiano, American upright bassist.
 30 – Arlen Roth, American guitarist.

 November
 4 – Jeff Lorber, American keyboardist, composer, and record producer.
 8 – Carl Haakon Waadeland, Norwegian drummer.
 12 – Laurence Juber, English guitarist, Wings.
 16 – Lauren Newton, American singer and composer.
 28 – Ole Thomsen, Norwegian guitarist.
 30 – Chris Joris, Belgian percussionist, pianist, and composer.

 December
 2 – Rob Mounsey, American keyboarder, composer, and arranger.
 8
 Mathias Rüegg, Swiss pianist, composer, bandleader, director, Vienna Art Orchestra.
 Reynold Philipsek, American guitarist, singer-songwriter, and poet. 
 Ric Sanders, English violinist.
 23 – Jay Azzolina, American guitarist, Spyro Gyra.
 24 – Chucho Merchán, Colombian bassist and guitarist.
 27 – David Knopfler, British singer-songwriter, guitarist, pianist, record producer, poet, and writer. 
 29 – Joe Lovano, American saxophonist, alto clarinetist, flautist, and drummer.

 Unknown date
 Akio Sasajima, Japanese guitarist.
 Brad Upton, American trumpeter.
 Eugene Friesen, American cellist and composer.
 Gordon Johnson, American upright bassist.
 Roberto Perera, Uruguayan harpist.

See also

 1950s in jazz
 List of years in jazz
 1952 in music

References

Bibliography

External links 
 History Of Jazz Timeline: 1952 at All About Jazz

Jazz
Jazz by year